is a train station in the city of Kurashiki, Okayama Prefecture, Japan. It is on the Mizushima Main Line, operated by the Mizushima Rinkai Railway. Currently, all services stop at this station.

Lines
 Mizushima Rinkai Railway
 Mizushima Main Line

Adjacent stations

|-
!colspan=5|Mizushima Rinkai Railway

References

Mizushima Rinkai Railway Mizushima Main Line
Railway stations in Okayama Prefecture
Railway stations in Japan opened in 1988
Kurashiki